Retusin is an O-methylated flavonol, a type of flavonoid. It can be found in Origanum vulgare and in Ariocarpus retusus.

References 

 

O-methylated flavonols